Taison Barcellos Freda (born 13 January 1988), simply known as Taison, is a Brazilian professional footballer who plays as an attacking midfielder for Greek Super League club PAOK.

Club career

Internacional
Taison started his career with Brazilian club Internacional and quickly rose to prominence within their youth set up, becoming one of the brightest prospects at the club. After making his first team debut in 2008, he went on to become an instrumental part of the team, subsequently winning the Copa Sudamericana. His great form continued into the next season, where he won the Campeonato Gaúcho, the Suruga Bank Championship, and finished as runner-up in the Copa do Brasil. Taison's first stint at the club reached its conclusion in great fashion with the 2010 Copa Libertadores title.

Metalist Kharkiv
After being linked with a host of clubs across Europe, including Wolfsburg and Napoli Taison eventually signed for Ukrainian club Metalist Kharkiv for an approximate fee of 6 million euros. He started brightly in Ukraine and even pipped Willian to the "best new signing" accolade. The Brazilian scored an incredible Marco van Basten style volley against Rosenborg BK on 8 November 2012 in the Europa League. In the same game he also provided the assist for the second in a 3–1 win.

Shakhtar Donetsk

Taison signed with Shakhtar Donetsk on 1 January 2013 for a fee of around £12.4 million. He made his debut for Shakhtar in the Champions League against Borussia Dortmund in a 2–2 draw on 13 February 2013. He scored his first goal for Shakhtar and was named Man of the Match in a 3–3 draw with Metalurh Zaporizhya on 19 May 2013, scoring an equalising goal in the 92nd minute. Taison scored in a 3–0 victory over Chornomorets Odesa in the 2012–13 Ukrainian Cup final. On 10 July 2013 Taison scored in a 3–1 victory over Chornomorets in the Ukrainian Super Cup. In November 2019 he was sent-off after reacting to alleged racist abuse, and was also given a one-match ban.

Return to Internacional
On 16 April 2021, Internacional announced that Taison would be returning to his boyhood club after 11 years, signing a contract until 2023. The athlete took a significant paycut in order to make the deal happen, refusing more lucrative offers from various other clubs in order to return to Inter.

PAOK
On 14 January 2023, Taison joined Greek club PAOK for 1.5 years.

International career
In an interview with the coach of the Ukraine national team, Mykhaylo Fomenko spoke of him as a possible naturalized. Taison indicated that he would be likely to accept a call-up for Ukraine if asked. But on 22 August 2016, newly appointed manager Tite has called him up for the Brazil national team. On 13 June 2017, Taison scored his first international goal in a match against Australia, that ended 4–0. He scored the 3rd goal of the match.

In May 2018, he was named in Tite’s final 23 man squad for the 2018 World Cup in Russia.

Career statistics

Club

International

Scores and results list Brazil's goal tally first.

Honours
Internacional
Copa Sudamericana: 2008
Campeonato Gaúcho: 2009
Suruga Bank Championship: 2009
Copa Libertadores: 2010

Shakhtar Donetsk
Ukrainian Premier League: 2012–13, 2013–14, 2016–17, 2017–18, 2018–19, 2019–20
Ukrainian Cup: 2012–13, 2015–16, 2016–17, 2017–18, 2018–19
Ukrainian Super Cup: 2013, 2014, 2015, 2017

Individual
List of 33 Top Players of the Ukrainian Premier League: 2016–17
 Football Stars of Ukraine – Best UPL player: 2019
 Ukrainian Premier League Footballer of the Year: 2019
 Ukrainian Premier League Best Player of Season: 2019–20
UEFA Europa League Squad of the Season: 2019–20

References

External links

 Internacional.com.br 

1988 births
Living people
People from Pelotas
Sportspeople from Rio Grande do Sul
Brazilian footballers
Association football midfielders
Sport Club Internacional players
FC Metalist Kharkiv players
FC Shakhtar Donetsk players
PAOK FC players
Campeonato Brasileiro Série A players
Ukrainian Premier League players
Super League Greece players
Brazil international footballers
Copa Libertadores-winning players
2018 FIFA World Cup players
Brazilian expatriate footballers
Brazilian expatriate sportspeople in Ukraine
Expatriate footballers in Ukraine
Brazilian expatriate sportspeople in Greece
Expatriate footballers in Greece